The Sacred Heart Church  is a Roman Catholic church and parish  in Trott Street, Battersea,  South West London, that serves the Catholic community of Battersea and surrounding areas.

History
The church was designed by Frederick Walters in a late Norman style. It is built in red brick, with stone sills and some stone dressings entrance. The West Tower has an octagonal broached steeple. Inside, the ceiling is vaulted. The spire is copper clad.

The church was founded by priests of the Salesians. In November 1887, Saint Don Bosco (1815–1888) sent 3 Salesians to Battersea to form the first UK Salesian community, at the invitation of Countess Georgiana de Stacpoole, a notable benefactress of the Salesians in Paris. A small iron church was built at first, funded by the Countess, but a larger congregation demanded a larger building. On 3 August 1892 Bishop Butt blessed the first stone of the present church, which was dedicated on 14–15 October 1893.

The original metal church was offered for sale and purchased by William Edward Baily, who dismantled and moved it to Penzance.

See also
 St John Bosco College, Battersea
 Salesian College, Battersea

References

External links
 
  Parish website
 Wandsworth Council information

Roman Catholic churches in the London Borough of Wandsworth
19th-century Roman Catholic church buildings in the United Kingdom
Sacred Heart
Churches in the Diocese of Southwark
Salesian churches